Assyrians in Iran,, are an ethnic and linguistic minority in present-day Iran. The Assyrians of Iran speak Assyrian Neo-Aramaic, a neo-Aramaic language descended from Classical Syriac and elements of Akkadian, and are Eastern Rite Christians belonging mostly to the Assyrian Church of the East and also to the Ancient Church of the East, Assyrian Pentecostal Church, Chaldean Catholic Church and Assyrian Evangelical Church.

They share a common history and ethnic identity, rooted in shared linguistic, cultural and religious traditions, with Assyrians in Iraq, Assyrians in Turkey and Assyrians in Syria, as well as with the Assyrian diaspora.

The Assyrian community in Iran numbered approximately 200,000 prior to the Islamic Revolution of 1979.  In 1987, there were an estimated 50,000 Assyrians living in Tehran. However, after the revolution many Assyrians left the country, primarily for the United States; the 1996 Iranian census counted only 32,000 Assyrians.  Current estimates of the Assyrian population in Iran consist of 7,000 combined members of the Assyrian Church of the East and Chaldean Catholic Church in addition to less than 10,000 members of the Assyrian Evangelical Church.

The Iranian capital, Tehran, is home to the majority of Iranian Assyrians; however, approximately 15,000 Assyrians reside in northern Iran, in Urmia and various Assyrian villages in the surrounding area. To note among the Assyrian diaspora, the Assyrians residing in California and Russia tend to be originally from Iran.

The Constitution of the Islamic Republic of Iran, ratified in 1979, recognizes Assyrians as a religious minority and ethnic minority and reserves for them one seat in the Islamic Consultative Assembly, the Iranian parliament.  , the seat was occupied by Yonathan Betkolia, who was elected in 2000 and reelected in the 2004 legislative election.

In 2010, it was estimated that there were only around 5,000 Assyrians left in the historical center of the city of Urmia.

History 

The Assyrian presence in Iran goes back 4,000 years to ancient times, and Assyria was involved in the history of Ancient Iran even before the arrival of the modern Iranian peoples to the region circa 1000 BC. During the Old Assyrian Empire (c.2025-1750 BC) and Middle Assyrian Empire (1365-1020 BC) the Assyrians ruled over parts of Pre-Iranic northern and western Iran. The Neo-Assyrian Empire (911-605 BC) saw Assyria conquer the Iranic Persians, Medes and Parthians into their empire, together with the ancient pre-Iranic Elamites, Kassites, Manneans and Gutians, and also the Iranic Cimmerians of Asia Minor and Scythians of the Caucasus. The home of the Assyrians in Iran has traditionally been along the western shore of Lake Urmia from the Salmas area to the Urmia plain.

After the fall of Assyria between 612 and 599 BC, after decades of civil war, followed by an attack by an alliance of former subject peoples; the Medes, Persians, Babylonians, Chaldeans, Scythians and Cimmerians, its people became an integral part of the Achaemenid Empire (as did Assyria itself), holding important military, civic and economic positions, and the Achaemenid Persians, having spent centuries under Assyrian domination, were greatly influenced by Assyrian Art and Architecture, modelled their empire upon Assyrian lines, and saw themselves as the successors of the great Assyrian kings. Assyrians are still attested as being extant in the north west of the region during the Parthian Empire (160 BC-223 AD) and Sassanid Empire (224-650 AD), and throughout the Middle Ages, where the Bukhtishu family of physicians were held in great regard by the Persian kings.

There were about 200,000 Assyrians in Iran at the time of the 1976 census. Many emigrated after the revolution in 1979, but at least 50,000 were estimated to be still in Iran in 1987.

In 1900, Assyrians numbered over 76,000 in northwestern Iran, constituting over a quarter of the Azerbaijan province's population and were the largest non-Muslim majority in Urmia. Of the 300 villages around Urmia, 60 were exclusively Assyrians and 60 were mixed villages with Assyrian, Armenian, and Azeri communities. Nevertheless, there were over 115 documented Assyrian villages to the west of Lake Urmia prior to 1918.

During the Assyrian genocide, which took place during World War I, the Ottoman Army together with allied Kurdish and Arab militias along the Persian-Turkish and Persian-Iraqi border carried out religiously and ethnically motivated massacres and deportations on unarmed Assyrian civilians (and Armenians) both in the mountains and on the rich plains, resulting in the death of at least 300,000 Assyrians. This genocide that started in 1914 was said to be started with the Ottomans’ ‘Jihad’ declaration, apparently solely based on its ethnic and religious differences with the Assyrians because of their belief in Christianity, but actually there was an ambition to extend their ‘holy war’ beyond Assyrian territories to spread its Ottoman influences. 

The Ottomans already implemented massacres of several Assyrian tribes from 1843 to 1845, with the motive of taking over their ancestral lands and making them part of the Ottoman Empire. These tribes were particularly the Tiyari, Tkhuma, Jilu and Baz, who all refused Ottoman command. According to British councils, 10,000 Assyrians were massacred already during this time alone. Women and children were taken while Assyrian leaders were cast out from Ottoman forces. Assyrians felt forced to convert to for example Catholicism or Russian Orthodoxy to receive help from the Russian, French or British.  

In 1914 alone, they attacked dozens of villages and drove off all the inhabitants of the district of Gawar. The Assyrians defended themselves and for a time successfully repelled further attacks under the leadership of Agha Petros, seizing control of much of the Urmia region and defeating Ottoman forces and their Kurdish and Arab allies in the process. However, lack of ammunition and supplies, due mainly to the withdrawal of Russia from the war, and the collapse of allied Armenian forces led to their downfall. Massively outnumbered, surrounded, undersupplied and cut off, the Assyrians suffered terrible massacres. These included Assyrian deportations close to the Ottoman-Persian border in January 1915, as well as the invasion of several Assyrian tribes located in the Hakkari mountains. This area already suffered numerous massacres in the 1840s. 

By the summer of 1918 almost all surviving Assyrians had fled to Tehran or to existing Assyrian communities or refugee camps in Iraq such as Baqubah. Local Kurds and Arabs and took the opportunity of the last phases of World War I to rob Assyrian homes, murder civilians and leave those remaining destitute. The critical murder that sowed panic in the Assyrian community came when Kurdish militias, under Agha Ismail Simko, assassinated the Patriarch, Mar Benyamin Shimon XIX, on March 3, 1918, under the pretext of inviting him to negotiations, although the Assyrian leader Malik Khoshaba exacted revenge upon Simko by attacking and sacking his citadel, forcing the Kurdish leader to flee for his life.

Religious communities

Most Assyrians in Iran are followers of the Assyrian Church of the East, with a minority of 3,900 following the Chaldean Catholic Church. Some also follow Protestant denominations such as the Assyrian Evangelical Church, Assyrian Pentecostal Church and possibly Russian Orthodoxy due to a Russian Ecclesiastical Mission in Urmia during the 1900s.

Distribution

Urmia:
Abajalu, Abdulkandi, Adeh (ܥܕܐ), Aliabad, Aliawach, Alikumi, Alqayeh, Anhar, Ardishai, Armutaghaj, Babarud, Badelbu, Badiki, Balanush, Balu, Borashan, Chamaki, Chamashajan, Charagushi, Charbakhsh, Darbarut, Digala, Dizataka, Diszgeri, Gawilan, Geogtapa, Lower Gniza, Upper Gniza, Gulpashin/Gulpashan, Gowzgavand, Hesar Babaganja, Ikiaghaj, Iryawa, Jamlawa, Khanishan, Kosi, Lulpa, Mushawa, Nazlu, Piqabaklu, Qala, Qara-Aghaj, Qarajalu, Qaragoz, Qasemlu, Qezel Ashuq, Qurtapa, Saatlu, Sainabad, Sangar, Saralan, Sardarud, Shirabad (ܫܝܪܐܒܕ), Sir, Sopurghan, Taka, Tarmani, Tazakand, Urmia, Vazirabad, Yaghmiralu, Yengija, Zumalan (ܙܘܡܠܢ).
Margawar:
Diza, Gerdik, Gullistan, Nergi, Razhani.
Targawar:
Anbi, Balulan, Darband, Dastalan, Haki, Mavana (ܡܥܘܢܐ), Qurana, Salona, Shibani, Tuleki, Tulu.
Sumay Baradust:
Gangachin, Tazakand.
Salmas::
Akhtekhana, Chara, Delemon, Guliser, Khanaga, Khosrawa, Mahlam, Patamur, Qederabad, Sarna, Sawra, Ulah, Zewajik.

Churches

 Holy Mary (Mart Maryam) Church – Urmia
 St. Mary's Cathedral - Urmia
 St. Cyriacus Church - Urmia
 St. Daniel Church (fa) - Adeh
 St. John Church - Adeh - 1901
 Sts. Peter and Paul Church (fa) - Kelisakandi
 St. George Church (fa) - Sopurghan
 St. Peter Church (fa) - Qarabagh
 St. Sarkis Church (fa) - Kelisa-ye Sir
 St. George Church (fa) - Gulpashan
 St. John Church (fa) - Gawilan
 Holy Mary Church (fa) – Mavana
 St. Thomas Church - Balowlan

 Assyrian Pentecostal Church – Kermanshah – 1955
 St. Joseph (Mar Yozep) Church – Tehran (Forsat St.) – 1950
 St. Thomas (Mar Toma) Church (fa) – Tehran (Amirabad) – 1967

Famous Assyrians from Iran

 Hannibal Alkhas, poet and visual artist
 Andre Agassi, Assyrian-Armenian tennis player
 Evin Agassi, music artist
 Mike Agassi, Olympic boxer and father of Andre Agassi
 Ramona Amiri, Miss World Canada 2005
 Ashurbanipal Babilla, actor, theatre director, playwright and visual artist
 Steven Beitashour, MLS player
 Patrick Bet-David, Assyrian-Armenian entrepreneur
 George Bit Atanus, designed the current Assyrian flag in 1968.
 Bukhtishu family, famous physicians in the Middle Ages
 Beneil Dariush, MMA fighter
 Jack Douglas, television personality 
 Eprime Eshag, Fellow of Wadham College, Oxford
 Alexander L. George, Graham H. Stuart Professor of Political Science Emeritus at Stanford University
 Mar Youhannan Semaan Issayi, Archbishop of Assyro-Chaldean Metropolitan Tehran
 George Malek-Yonan, procured a seat in the Iranian Parliament for Assyrians
 Rosie Malek-Yonan, actress, author and activist
 Younan Nowzaradan, Assyrian-American physician and television personality (My 600-lb Life)
 Andrew David Urshan, evangelist and author

See also
 Christians in Iran
 Ethnic minorities in Iran
 List of Assyrian settlements
 Religious minorities in Iran
 Russian Ecclesiastical Mission in Urmia
 Da'tid Bahrana
 Urmia Orthodokseta

Notes

References

Bibliography
 Eden Naby, “The Assyrians of Iran: Reunification of a ‘Millat,’ 1906-1914" International Journal of Middle East Studies, 8. (1977) pp. 237–249
 Eden Naby, “The Iranian Frontier Nationalities: The Kurds, the Assyrians, the Baluch and the Turkmens,”Soviet Asian Ethnic Frontiers, ed.by McCagg and Silver (New York, Pergamon Press, 1979).
 Eden Naby, “Christian Assyrian Architecture of Iran,” News – Harvard University Center for the Study of World Religions (Spring 1998) vol. 5, no. 2, p. 7, 10.
 Eden Naby, "Ishtar: Documenting the Crisis in the Assyrian Iranian Community," MERIA 10/4 (2006)https://web.archive.org/web/20090124055153/http://meria.idc.ac.il/journal/2006/issue4/Naby.pdf

 
Iran
Ethnic groups in Iran